Kateryna Ihorivna Taranenko née Humenyuk (born 4 July 1994), known professionally as Assol, is a Ukrainian singer. In 2016, she participated in the Ukrainian edition of The Voice.

Career
Assol first performed on stage at the age of three. Assol has released two popular albums in Ukraine and is known all over her home country. She has also appeared in several television music shows and in a television series by Svetlana Druzhinina. In 2000, she won the children's competition in Slavianski Bazaar in Vitebsk and released her debut album. Assol currently resides in Kyiv.

Discography

Albums
 Alye Parusa (2000)
 Vkraino moya (2002)
 O Tebe (2008)
 Tayut guby (2010)

National Music awards
 Winner of two diplomas of Russian World Record Registration Committee.
 For songs popularization won a trophy on "Territory A”
 Participation in TV projects "Song of the Year", "Velyke Pranniya" (Large Washing), "Hit of the Year" and "Gold Barrel-organ".
 Participation in "Horoshi Pisni" (Good Songs) festivals.
 Laureate of National Prize "Person of the Year".
 Filming in the film serial "Vivat, Anna Ioanovna”
 Participation in New Years Day Musical "Subway”

References

xitexsoftware.com
 https://web.archive.org/web/20100803020258/http://www.assol.webs.com/

1994 births
Living people
21st-century Ukrainian women singers
Ukrainian pop singers
The Voice of Ukraine contestants